Dan Raviv (born 1954) is an American journalist.

Career 
Raviv is the senior Washington correspondent for i24 News, headquartered in Tel Aviv and New York. Previously he was with CBS News as their national correspondent and was heard regularly on the CBS Radio Network. He had also done TV reports from Washington, D.C. on the CBS Evening News, and he narrated the 1997-98 revival of the CBS TV news shorts series for children In the News.

Up until January 21, 2017, Raviv was host of a weekly radio magazine show, the CBS News Weekend Roundup.

A New York City native and graduate of Harvard, Raviv joined CBS at its all-news radio station in Boston (WEEI) in 1974, moving to WCBS Newsradio in New York in 1976, then to the network radio newsdesk in New York.  The start of his on-air career was his assignment in the Tel Aviv bureau, from 1978 to 1980, followed by twelve years as radio correspondent in the London bureau.  There, he began making occasional appearances on CBS TV.  He worked in the Miami bureau from 1993 to 1997, and then was named National Correspondent in the radio unit at CBS News in Washington. In 2017 he joined i24 News upon the network's launching of a channel in the United States. 
He is also the author of several books, including the 1990 best seller Every Spy a Prince: The Complete History of Israel's Intelligence Community, co-authored with journalist Yossi Melman.

Personal life 
Raviv is married, with two adult children.

See also
 Ronald Perelman
 Carl Icahn
 Avi Arad
 Marvel Comics
 Toy Biz

References

External links

American political writers
American radio journalists
American television reporters and correspondents
Harvard University alumni
1954 births
Living people
American male journalists
CBS News people